Fort Shelby may refer to:

 Fort Shelby (Michigan), U.S.
 Fort Shelby (Wisconsin), U.S.
 Fort Shelby Hotel in Detroit, U.S.

See also
 Camp Shelby, in Hattiesburg, Mississippi, U.S.